Shuswap River Islands Provincial Park is a provincial park in British Columbia, Canada.
The park was established as a result of the Okanagan-Shuswap Land and Resource Management Plan. Size: 1.85 km2.

External links

 Location map

Monashee Mountains
Provincial parks of British Columbia
Protected areas established in 2004
2004 establishments in British Columbia